God's Not Dead 2 is a 2016 American Christian drama film, directed by Harold Cronk, and starring Melissa Joan Hart, Jesse Metcalfe, David A. R. White, Hayley Orrantia and Sadie Robertson. It is a sequel to God's Not Dead (2014), and the second installment in the titular film series. Aside from David A.R. White reprising his role as Reverend David Hill, Paul Kwo, Benjamin Onyango, and Tricha LaFache also reprise their roles as Martin Yip, Reverend Jude, and Amy Ryan respectively.  It follows a high school teacher facing a court case that could end her career, after having answered a student's seemingly innocuous question about Jesus.  The film presents an evangelical perspective on the separation of church and state.

The film received widely negative reviews from critics, who considered it a wildly unrealistic example of alleged anti-Christian legal cases to the point of playing into the Christian persecution complex; the film's understanding of how church and state are balanced in education was criticized as "wholly divorced from any rational understanding of the topic".  The film is seemingly an inversion of historical cases of prosecution of science teachers over the teaching of evolution, portrayed in films such as Inherit the Wind.  As with God's Not Dead, critics felt that atheists were again portrayed as flat stereotypes and as unrealistic, scheming villains.

God's Not Dead 2 was released on April 1, 2016. It was the final film role for Fred Dalton Thompson, who died in November 2015. Despite being a large critical failure, it was moderately successful at the box office, earning $24 million on a $5 million budget, though making for a total gross of almost a third of its predecessor.

Plot
AP History teacher Grace Wesley, a devout evangelical Christian, notices that one of her students, Brooke Thawley, is withdrawn following the recent accidental death of her brother. Involved in little more than her studies, Brooke notices Grace's hope-filled attitude and asks where Grace finds her optimism. Grace replies "Jesus", and Brooke begins to read the Bible for herself. As Grace lectures on Mahatma Gandhi and Martin Luther King Jr., Brooke asks whether their peaceful teachings relate to the biblical account of the Sermon on the Mount. Grace responds in the affirmative and relates parts of scripture to his teachings. One student immediately texts his parents about the class, and the ensuing backlash draws the ire of Principal Kinney. She reprimands Grace, saying that the teacher's faith clouded her judgment. Grace is subsequently brought before the School Board, who informs her that legal action will be taken against her as she has violated the separation of church and state. Grace's case draws the attention of Tom Endler, a defense attorney who is willing to aid her despite being an unbeliever himself.

After speaking to his friend Josh, Martin Yip, a college student, visits Pastor David Hill to ask him several questions about God. Former left-wing blogger Amy Ryan goes to the hospital and finds out that her cancer has miraculously vanished. She talks to Michael Tait of the Newsboys, who encourages her, stating that with faith, prayers can be answered. Amy ponders this, and later makes her blog a diary about her adventures with God.

The School Board brings Grace's case before a judge in Little Rock, Arkansas, hoping to secure her termination and strip her of her teaching license unless she issues an apology, which Grace refuses to do. To Brooke's horror, prosecutor Pete Kane declares that the lawsuit will "prove once and for all that God is dead". His opening argument suggests that the society of the United States will crumble should Grace fail to be found guilty. Endler defends the idea that Jesus was a literal historical figure and thus an appropriate subject of classroom debate. Christian apologist J. Warner Wallace is called as an expert witness, along with Lee Strobel, to defend the idea.

Brooke is allowed as a witness. Kane tricks her into admitting that it was Grace and not Brooke who initiated their first conversation about Jesus. As Grace becomes more and more discouraged, Brooke and her friends sing her a song in an attempt to build up her spirits. Martin visits David in the hospital with his friend Jude and announces that he feels his call is as a pastor in China. Using a tactic to position Grace as a hostile witness, Endler gets the judge to inform the jury not to let their bias or prejudices interfere with their verdict. The jury ultimately finds in favor of Grace, who rejoices along with Brooke and Endler as Kane stands humiliated. As they celebrate their victory, Brooke Thawley convinces the crowd that "God's not dead" so they could receive the good news, while Newsboys sing their song "Guilty", dedicating it to Grace standing up to court.

At one point, a character delivers an explanation of what Martin Luther King meant in his famous letter from the Birmingham jail, which he does to the African-American principal of the school.

In a post-credits scene, a fully recovered David is arrested by the police for failing to turn in his sermons to the government, as shown earlier in the film. Jude and Martin watch as David is taken away. Then, Martin wonders what to do next, and Jude replies "Same as always, Martin. We pray in faith." as David is driven off to jail, setting up the events for God's Not Dead: A Light in Darkness.

Cast

 Melissa Joan Hart as Grace Wesley, a devout evangelical AP History teacher who struggles between giving up her faith or giving up her job.
 Jesse Metcalfe as Tom Endler, Grace's attorney
 David A. R. White as Reverend David Hill
 Hayley Orrantia as Brooke Thawley, a high school student who converts to Christianity
 Sadie Robertson as Marlene, one of Grace's students and a friend of Brooke. In real life, the actress is the daughter of Duck Dynasty host Willie Robertson and his wife Korie, both of whom made cameos in the first film.
 Ernie Hudson as Judge Robert Stennis, the judge in charge of Wesley's case
 Pat Boone as Walter Wesley, Grace's grandfather
 Fred Dalton Thompson as Senior Pastor
 Robin Givens as Principal Kinney, the principal of Martin Luther King Jr. High School
 Carey Scott as Richard Thawley, Brooke's father
 Maria Canals-Barrera as Catherine Thawley, Brooke's mother
 Benjamin Onyango as Reverend Jude
 Ray Wise as Pete Kane
 Paul Kwo as Martin Yip, a college student who previously appeared in the first film.
 Jon Lindstrom as Jim Powell
 Eamonn McCrystal as Simon Boyle
 Abigail Duhon as Jessica
 Trisha LaFache as Amy Ryan, a former atheist blogger who converted to Christianity and is now healed from cancer

Production
Filming took place in Little Rock, Arkansas, including the Pulaski County courthouse, near Hillcrest, Arkansas, and in Saline County.

Both the Christian rock band The Newsboys and former Arkansas Governor Mike Huckabee have cameos. Christian apologists and authors Lee Strobel and J. Warner Wallace appear as trial witnesses. Local NBC affiliate KARK-TV personalities Mallory Brooks and Victoria Price both appear as reporters.

Release

Promotion
The day before the Iowa caucuses, presidential candidate Mike Huckabee (who appears in one scene) offered a free screening of the film.

Box office
God's Not Dead 2 was projected to gross around $14 million from 2,419 theaters in its opening weekend by Box Office Pro, which pointed to the first film's unprecedented successful $9.2 million opening from roughly 1/3 the number of locations God's Not Dead 2 would debut in; however, it debuted to just $7.6 million, finishing fourth at the box office, behind Batman v Superman: Dawn of Justice ($51.3 million), Zootopia ($19.3 million) and My Big Fat Greek Wedding 2 ($11.2 million). In its second weekend, it fell -44.4%, grossing $4.2 million and finishing seventh. As of December 2019, the film has grossed over $20.8 million domestically, $1.5 million in Brazil, and $24.5 million worldwide,  less than 40% of the worldwide gross of God's Not Dead.

Critical response
Like its predecessor, God's Not Dead 2 was heavily panned by critics. Rotten Tomatoes gives the film a rating of 10%, based on 40 reviews, with an average rating of 3.42/10. The site's consensus states: "Every bit the proselytizing lecture promised by its title, God's Not Dead 2 preaches ham-fistedly to its paranoid conservative choir." On Metacritic, the film has a score of 22 out of 100, based on 8 critics, indicating "generally unfavorable reviews." Audiences polled by CinemaScore gave the film an average grade of "A" on an A+ to F scale. Deadline noted that "faith-based films have an easy time gaining an A on CinemaScore."

Many reviews focus on the deeply unrealistic nature of the events portrayed. For example, Silpa Kovvali, writing in Salon wrote:

Bill Zwecker of the Chicago Sun-Times felt that the underlying issues presented in the film are relevant in today's world, but criticized the lack of subtlety, saying, "the entire film simply comes off as a two-hour, jazzed-up movie version of a sermon." Frank Scheck of The Hollywood Reporter criticized the film's straw man argument and its perceived victimizing of Christians, writing, "Pounding its agenda with all the subtlety of a sledgehammer, God's Not Dead 2 will no doubt please its target audience. Everyone else will be left wondering why its fans seem to be suffering from such a persecution complex." Jordan Hoffman at The Guardian deemed it "a much better movie than God's Not Dead, but that's a bit like saying a glass of milk left on the table hasn't curdled and is merely sour," and stated that "it is unfortunately just professional enough that there are only brief instances of transcendent badness, rather than drawn-out sequences." Shelia O'Malley of RogerEbert.com gave the film 1.5/4 stars and acknowledged that "there are serious movies about the Christian faith, about the persecution of the faithful, and about the intolerance that goes both ways," but that "God's Not Dead 2 is not one of them."

Michael Foust's review in The Christian Post said the film is "a much-improved sequel," with better acting and a more believable plot.

References

Sequels

A third film in the series, God's Not Dead: A Light in Darkness, was released in March 2018 and a fourth, God's Not Dead: We The People, was released in October 2021.

External links
 
 
 
 
 

2016 films
2010s legal drama films
American legal drama films
American sequel films
American courtroom films
Films about Christianity
Films about evangelicalism
Films about the education system in the United States
Films about educators
Films directed by Harold Cronk
Films set in Arkansas
Films shot in Arkansas
Pure Flix Entertainment films
Separation of church and state in the United States
Films produced by Russell Wolfe
Religious drama films
2016 drama films
Criticism of atheism
Films about religion
Films produced by David A. R. White
2010s English-language films
2010s American films
God's Not Dead (film series)